Third is the third and most recent studio album by the English band Portishead. It was released on 28 April 2008 in the United Kingdom by Island Records and a day later in the United States by Mercury Records. Portishead's first studio album in eleven years, Third moved away from the trip hop style they had popularised, incorporating influences such as krautrock, surf rock, doo wop and the film soundtracks of John Carpenter.

After Portishead released their self-titled second album in 1997, band member Geoff Barrow put Portishead on hiatus and moved to Australia. He became uninterested in music, and efforts to develop new songs with guitarist and keyboardist Adrian Utley failed. They were inspired to create again after producing with the band the Coral, and restarted work with singer Beth Gibbons in Bristol, England.

Third entered the top ten of several countries' music charts and was certified gold in the UK. It was named one of the best albums of 2008 by several publications; in 2013, NME ranked it number 330 in its list of the 500 Greatest Albums of All Time.

Background 
In 1998, following three years of tours and a divorce, drummer and songwriter Geoff Barrow put Portishead on hiatus and went to Australia. He told Drowned in Sound: "I couldn't find anything I liked musically in anybody, in anything." Guitarist and keyboardist Adrian Utley joined him to work on new material, but they were not satisfied with the results.

In 2003, Barrow wrote "Magic Doors", which he described as "an opening ... then we ended up going back and forth, hating everything and then liking everything, and we had to decide whether to carry on." He and Utley co-produced the 2005 Coral album The Invisible Invasion. The process proved inspiring; according to Barrow, "Here's me and Ade, these older dudes, too scared to even play a note because we were scared we'd hate it, and there’s them, just being able to write a soundtrack in an afternoon."

Recording 
Portishead self-produced Third in their Bristol studios. Many of the songs existed for years as sketches, with the members exchanging recordings and adding ideas. By 2006, Portishead had prepared six or seven tracks. Barrow said most of the record was written during a "spurt" at the end of 2007.

Wanting to move away from the trip hop sound they had popularised, Portishead avoided using instruments they had used before; Barrow said "the basic thing was to sound like ourselves, not to repeat ourselves". The band members experimented with swapping roles; Barrow played bass, and singer Beth Gibbons played guitar on "Threads". Utley said Portishead were "looking for limited frequency in instruments ... limited playing, too. I pursued virtuosity for many years, learning scales and harmony, and being able to improvise through scales and chords, but technique isn't important for me any more."

For the first track, "Silence", Barrow initially sampled a record that had a spoken-word Portuguese introduction. Inspired by a Wiccan theory about the number three, Portishead wrote a "manifesto", had it translated into Portuguese, then recreated the sample with the new words to introduce the album. They did not synchronise the guitar's delay effect with the tempo, creating harsh, asynchronous echoes.

Portishead used several analogue synthesisers, including a Minimoog, Korg MS-20, ARP 2600, Siel Orchestra and VCS 3, and a clavioline, an electronic keyboard that predates the synthesiser. For "Threads", the band used the "evil" detuned sound of the VCS 3 to create a foreboding horn-like sound, inspired by the English progressive rock band Hawkwind. The Siel Orchestra's sequencer was not sophisticated enough to play the arpeggios in "The Rip", so the band recorded the notes individually and edited them into an arpeggio pattern. The track also features a toy acoustic guitar Utley found in a junk shop.

"Deep Water" was inspired by Steve Martin's performance of "Tonight You Belong to Me" in the 1979 film The Jerk. Utley was initially unimpressed with Barrow's concept for the song, and said: "I couldn't get with it at all, didn't like it. Geoff said he wanted to put these backing vocals on it, and I said I was having nothing to do with it. We didn't argue, I just conceded on that. But now I really quite like it, and the funny thing is Geoff is moving the other way on it."

To create the rhythm on "Machine Gun", Portishead sampled the drum machine in an old electronic organ. The synthesiser outro was inspired by the film soundtracks of John Carpenter. For "Magic Doors", the band added hurdy-gurdy, and saxophone played by Will Gregory of Goldfrapp. According to Utley, "We made [Gregory] be a free jazz player that day ... We told him just to go fucking mad, to freak the fuck out. He had to move out of the room, so we couldn't see him, so he'd feel less inhibited."

Music 
Described as an electronica, experimental rock and psychedelic rock record, Third departs from Portishead's trip hop sound, the genre they had popularised with their albums Dummy (1994) and Portishead (1997). It also contains no turntable scratching, a hallmark of their earlier albums. Gareth Grundy of Q wrote that "Thirds sole link with the past is Gibbons' voice ... Everything else has been binned, the hip hop, the cinematic feel, the lot." Instead, the album contains "muscular" synthesisers, drum breaks and abrupt endings, with "propulsive" krautrock rhythms, break beats, cathedral organ, "Moroccan drones" and surf rock. The AV Club wrote that singer Gibbons "sounds more hollowed-out and harrowed than ever, a human nervous twitch on too much coffee and too little sleep".

The opening track, "Silence", has a "propulsive" drum loop and "Morse code"-like guitar. "We Carry On" has a "claustrophobic" two-note electro riff; Rolling Stone likened it to the work of the American psychedelic band Silver Apples. "Deep Water" is a "ukulele doo-wop". "Machine Gun" is driven by a "mechanical" rhythm that gives way to synthesisers which Drowned in Sound likened to the soundtracks of the 1980s films The Terminator and Blade Runner. "Magic Doors" features "huge" piano chords, "tick-tocking" cowbell, and "corrupted" brass.

Release and promotion
Third was released on 28 April 2008 on Island Records in the United Kingdom, 29 April Mercury Records in the United States, and 30 April on Universal Music Japan in Japan. It entered the UK Albums Chart at number two and the US Billboard 200 at number seven, becoming Portishead's highest US chart debut, selling 53,000 copies.

On 8 and 9 December 2007, Portishead curated the All Tomorrow's Parties festival in Minehead, England, and performed their first full sets in nearly 10 years, including tracks from Third. On 21 January 2008, Portishead announced a European tour to support the album, with a headline spot at the Coachella Valley Music and Arts Festival on 26 April 2008, their only US date on the tour.

On 21 April 2008, a week before its release, Third was made available as a free stream on Last.fm, attracting 327,000 listeners in 24 hours. It was the first time Last.fm made an album available before its release. Third was the fifth-bestselling vinyl record of 2008, selling 12,300 copies.

Reception

At Metacritic, which assigns a weighted average score out of 100 to reviews and ratings from mainstream critics, Third has a metascore of 85 based on 38 reviews, indicating "universal acclaim".

In his review for AllMusic, Stephen Thomas Erlewine said Third was "genuinely, startlingly original" and "utterly riveting and endlessly absorbing". The A.V. Club Michaelangelo Matos wrote that "nearly every track provides some little sonic goody midway through as a reward for continued attention after all these years. For once, it's worth the effort." Reviewing Third for Drowned in Sound, Nick Southall wrote that "several individual songs drift by almost unnoticed at first, contributing little more than a sense of unease to the collective memory of the album; an impression of oppression. Those numbers that do stand out, though, drag the record close to magnificence." John Payne of the Los Angeles Times wrote: "Though several doses of this languid, tension-filled music get a tad draining, taken altogether it is a suitable sound for our troubling times, and there's an invigorating mysteriousness. Its blaring electronic peals are a wake-up call." Guardian reviewer Jude Rogers found that the album "is initially more a record to admire than to love ... But after several listens, Third majesty unfurls."

Louis Pattison of NME wrote that Third was "adventurous, sometimes dauntingly so – but seldom anything less than compelling" and said it was Portishead's best album. PopMatters' Alan Ranta wrote that it would eventually be seen on par with Portishead's earlier work. Pitchforks Nate Patrin named Third the week's "best new music", writing that it was "a staggering transformation and a return to form that was never lost, an ideal adaptation by a group that many people didn't know they needed to hear again". In Rolling Stone, Rob Sheffield wrote that Third was "an unexpected yet totally impressive return". Mike Bruno of Entertainment Weekly said it was less accessible than Portishead's earlier music, but "no less gorgeous". Gareth Grundy of Q gave it three out of five and was disappointed that Portishead had moved away from their earlier sound, writing: "Third will probably be more admired than listened to ... Dummy was a challenging record that just happened to find an audience. Third merely turns up the black until the darkness is overwhelming."

Third was named the best album of 2008 by PopMatters, second best by Pitchfork, ninth by the Guardian, and 25th by NME. It was included in the 2014 edition of 1001 Albums You Must Hear Before You Die. In 2019, the Guardian named it the 45th best album of the 21st century. In December 2008, American webzine Somewhere Cold ranked Third No. 7 on their 2008 Somewhere Cold Awards Hall of Fame. In 2013, NME named it number 330 in its list of the 500 Greatest Albums of All Time.

Track listing

Personnel
 Beth Gibbons – vocals, keyboards, electric guitar on "Threads"
 Geoff Barrow – drums, keyboards, synthesizer, bass guitar, percussion, programming
 Adrian Utley – electric guitar, acoustic guitar, bass guitar, ukulele, keyboards, synthesizer, programming
 Charlotte Nicholls – cello on "Silence" and "Threads"
 Claudio Campos – spoken intro on "Silence"
 Wendy Bertram – bassoon on "The Rip"
 Team Brick – clarinet on "Plastic," vocals on "Deep Water"
 David Poore & Ben Salisbury (the Somerfield Workers Choir) – vocals on "Deep Water"
 Will Gregory – saxophone on "Magic Doors" and "Threads"
 John Baggott – rhodes piano on "Magic Doors"
 Stu Barker – hurdy-gurdy on "Magic Doors"
 Clive Deamer – drums on "Threads"
 Jim Barr – bass guitar on "Threads"

Production
Producer – Portishead
Recording engineers – Adrian Utley, Stuart Matthews, Rik Dowding, John Pickford
Mix engineers – Geoff Barrow, Craig Silvey
Art design – Marc Bessant
Photography – Larry Bennett

Charts

Weekly charts

Year-end charts

Certifications

Release history
Third has been released in various formats.

References

External links
  NME interview with Geoff Barrow and Adrian Utley discussing the tracks on the album.

2008 albums
Albums produced by Geoff Barrow
Island Records albums
Mercury Records albums
Portishead (band) albums